The Real Underground is a compilation of out-of-print and previously unreleased recordings by Tommy Keene. It was released on CD in 1993 by Alias Records (catalog #A-045).

Track listing
All songs written by Tommy Keene, except where noted
"Places That Are Gone" – 3:55
"Nothing Happened Yesterday" – 3:57
"Baby Face" – 3:35
"Back to Zero Now" – 3:05
"When the Truth Is Found" – 3:04
"Hey! Little Child" – 3:16 (Alex Chilton)
Originally recorded by Alex Chilton, 1980
"Something Got a Hold of Me" – 3:24
"The Real Underground" – 3:50
"Misunderstood" – 2:58
"That You Do" – 3:22
"Mr. Roland" – 5:39
"Back Again (Try)" – 4:04
"Safe in the Light" – 3:50
"People With Fast Cars Drive Fast" – :56
"Love Is the Only Thing That Matters" – 2:33
"Dull Afternoon" – 1:43
"Tattoo" – 2:57 (Pete Townshend)
Originally recorded by The Who, 1967
"Don't Sleep in the Daytime" – 3:21
"Hey Man" – 1:41
"Andrea" – 3:17
"Something to Rave About" – 2:44
"Shake Some Action" – 4:31 (Cyril Jordan, Chris Wilson)
Originally recorded by Flamin' Groovies, 1976
"Sleeping on a Rollercoaster" – 3:34

Personnel

The band
Tommy Keene — Vocals, lead guitar, keyboards
Ted Nicely — Bass guitar ("Places That Are Gone", "Nothing Happened Yesterday", "Baby Face", "Back to Zero Now", "When the Truth Is Found", "Hey! Little Child", "Something Got a Hold of Me", "The Real Underground", "Misunderstood", "That You Do", "Mr. Roland", "Back Again (Try)", "Safe in the Light", "People With Fast Cars Drive Fast", "Love Is the Only Thing That Matters", "Dull Afternoon")
Billy Connelly — Guitar, back-up vocals ("Places That Are Gone", "Nothing Happened Yesterday", "Baby Face", "Back to Zero Now", "When the Truth Is Found", "Hey! Little Child", "Something Got a Hold of Me", "The Real Underground", "Misunderstood", "That You Do", "Mr. Roland", "Back Again (Try)", "Safe in the Light")
Doug Tull — Drums ("Places That Are Gone", "Nothing Happened Yesterday", "Baby Face", "Back to Zero Now", "When the Truth Is Found", "Hey! Little Child", "Something Got a Hold of Me", "The Real Underground", "Misunderstood", "That You Do", "Mr. Roland", "Back Again (Try)", "Safe in the Light", "People With Fast Cars Drive Fast", "Love Is the Only Thing That Matters")
Brad Quinn — Bass guitar, back-up vocals ("Hey Man", "Andrea", "Something to Rave About", "Shake Some Action", "Sleeping on a Rollercoaster")
John Richardson — Drums ("Hey Man", "Andrea", "Something to Rave About", "Shake Some Action", "Sleeping on a Rollercoaster")

Additional musicians
Justin Hibbard — Lead guitar ("Hey Man"), rhythm guitar ("Something to Rave About", "Sleeping on a Rollercoaster")
Eric Peterson — Lead guitar ("Andrea"), 2nd lead break ("Shake Some Action")

Production
Tommy Keene — Producer ("Places That Are Gone", "Nothing Happened Yesterday", "Baby Face", "Back to Zero Now", "When the Truth Is Found", "Hey! Little Child", "Something Got a Hold of Me", "The Real Underground", "Misunderstood", "That You Do", "Mr. Roland", "People With Fast Cars Drive Fast", "Love Is the Only Thing That Matters", "Dull Afternoon", "Tattoo", "Don't Sleep in the Daytime", "Hey Man", "Andrea", "Something to Rave About", "Shake Some Action", "Sleeping on a Rollercoaster")
Ted Nicely — Producer ("Places That Are Gone", "Nothing Happened Yesterday", "Baby Face", "Back to Zero Now", "When the Truth Is Found", "Hey! Little Child", "Something Got a Hold of Me", "The Real Underground", "Misunderstood", "That You Do", "Mr. Roland")
Steve Carr — Engineer ("Places That Are Gone", "Nothing Happened Yesterday", "Baby Face", "Back to Zero Now", "When the Truth Is Found", "Hey! Little Child", "Something Got a Hold of Me", "The Real Underground", "Misunderstood", "That You Do", "Mr. Roland", "People With Fast Cars Drive Fast", "Love Is the Only Thing That Matters", "Dull Afternoon", "Tattoo", "Don't Sleep in the Daytime", "Hey Man", "Andrea", "Something to Rave About", "Shake Some Action", "Sleeping on a Rollercoaster")
T-Bone Burnett — Producer ("Back Again (Try)")
Don Dixon — Producer ("Back Again (Try)", "Safe in the Light")
Steve Haigler — Engineer ("Back Again (Try)")
Steve Gronback — Engineer ("Safe in the Light")
Phil Brown — Mastering

Additional credits
Recorded at Hit and Run Studios, Rockville, Maryland ("Places That Are Gone", "Nothing Happened Yesterday", "Baby Face", "Back to Zero Now", "When the Truth Is Found", "Hey! Little Child", "Something Got a Hold of Me", "The Real Underground", "Misunderstood", "That You Do", "Mr. Roland", "People With Fast Cars Drive Fast", "Love Is the Only Thing That Matters", "Dull Afternoon", "Tattoo", "Don't Sleep in the Daytime", "Hey Man", "Andrea", "Something to Rave About", "Shake Some Action", "Sleeping on a Rollercoaster")
Recorded at Reflection, Charlotte, North Carolina ("Back Again (Try)")
Remixed at TGS Studios, North Carolina ("Safe in the Light")
Mastered at DigiPrep
Moki — Cover photo
Tommy Keene — Photography
Rick Gershon — Liner notes
Greg Stata — A.D.
Ed Morgan — Manager
"Thanks to Bobby, Ed, Jon, Delight, The Alias Staff, Steve, Brad, Petri, Diane Stata, Mark Kates, Tom Zutaut"

Sources
CD liner notes

Tommy Keene albums
1993 compilation albums
Albums produced by Don Dixon (musician)